Öncel is a Turkish given name and surname. Notable people with the surname include:

 Fuat Necati Öncel (born 1940), Turkish lawyer and politician
 Nazan Öncel (born 1956), Turkish singer-songwriter
 Rıdvan Öncel, Turkish basketball player

Turkish-language surnames